Marianne Alvoni (born 15 April 1964, in Berne) is a Swiss fashion designer.

In 2011, Marianne Alvoni was invited to present her fashion in Singapore through V-Zug (http://www.vzug.com), the Swiss market leader for household appliances.

In 1985, she opened her own atelier in Berne (Switzerland). Alvoni bought her first sewing machine with installment payments of 20 Swiss francs per month. In 1989 she moved to larger premises with a shopfront in the old town of Berne. In 2011 Marianne opened her atelier in Worb, where she also lives with her family, near Berne.

Further proof of her nationwide recognition is in the cultural field. Three models from her collection to mark the 700-year celebration of the Swiss Confederation were chosen as permanent exhibits for the Swiss National Museum (Schweizerisches Landesmuseum) in Zurich.

At the centre of her creation, elaborately produced in her atelier, there are, alongside her Alvoni Weekdays daywear collection, above all, Alvoni Haute Couture, evening-wear and wedding dresses.

Today Alvoni lives in Worb, Switzerland and Verona, Italy.

TV shows on: SF DRS Schweizer Fernsehen (Switzerland), MTV (Great Britain), 
Novosti Modi-Moskwa (Russia), RaiDue (Italy), various Private TV Stations in Switzerland

References

External links 
http://www.alvoni.ch
Marianne Alvoni and James Bond - Casino Royale
Fashion Show Videos 
http://www.v-zug.com

1964 births
Living people
Haute couture
Swiss designers
Swiss fashion designers
Swiss women fashion designers
People from Bern